Vera Thamm (born 30 October 1990) is a retired German Paralympic swimmer who competed in international level events. She was born without her lower arms and lower leg. She has represented Germany at the 2012 Summer Paralympics but did not medal in her three events.

Since her retirement from competitive swimming in 2016, she is a project manager of the German Disability Sports Federation in developing the promotion of full-time employment for people who have impairments in sports organisations.

References

1990 births
Living people
People from Haltern
Sportspeople from Münster (region)
Sportspeople from Leverkusen
Swimmers at the 2012 Summer Paralympics
Medalists at the World Para Swimming Championships
Medalists at the World Para Swimming European Championships
S3-classified Paralympic swimmers